USS Pirate (AM-275) was an Admirable-class minesweeper built for the U.S. Navy during World War II. She was built to clear minefields in offshore waters, and served the Navy in the North Atlantic Ocean and then in the Pacific Ocean. She was returned to active service for the Korean War. During Operation Wonsan she struck a mine and sunk. For her dangerous work, she was awarded four battle stars for her Korean War effort.

History
The second U.S. Navy warship named USS Pirate, she was laid down 1 July 1943 by Gulf Shipbuilding Co., Chickasaw, Alabama, launched 16 December 1943; sponsored by Mrs. Clara L. Oliver and commissioned 16 June 1944.

That summer, Pirate operated in and around Casco Bay and Boston, Massachusetts; conducted ASW exercises with Italian submarine  and with Task Group TG 23.9 in early-August, and later that month swept the channel from Boston to Provincetown, Massachusetts. In December she transferred  to Miami, Florida, where she was school ship for student officers for the next four months.

Pirate got underway from Miami 4 April 1945 to transit the Panama Canal, stopping at San Diego, California, and proceeding on to Pearl Harbor for duty. She departed Pearl Harbor and proceeded with MinDiv 32 via Eniwetok to Apra Harbor, Guam 7 June. As Allied forces made the final drive on Okinawa, Pirate reported at Nakagusuku Bay 26 June. In September she was minesweeping in area "Arcadia", in and around Jinsen, Korea, and operated off the northern coast of Formosa in November.

Decommissioned at Bremerton, Washington on 6 November 1946, the ship reported to ServPac in December 1947 for deployment in Japanese waters. In a caretaker status, she retained this status, out of service in reserve for the next several years

In July 1950, Pirate was with MinDiv 32, ServPac when hostilities in Korea called her back into active service. Recommissioned 14 August 1950 at Yokosuka, Japan, she departed Sasebo 8 September for duties off Pusan, Korea.

Sinking within five minutes, Pirate had 12 sailors missing and one dead.

Aftermath

Attempts were made to salvage Pirate but failed so explosives were placed in her wreck and detonated to prevent North Korean forces from recovering any classified material. Additional aircraft and boats from other nearby warships arrived at the area after the action to help in the rescue operations.

USS Pirate, Pledge and Redhead each received the Presidential Unit Citation and their commanders were awarded the Silver Star for bravery.  was mined off Wonsan on February 2 and became the last American vessel to be destroyed during operations in that area. Sometime in 1952, Lieutenant McMullen received an anonymous package containing Pirates battle flag and on May 28, 1985, it was donated to the Naval Historical Center and is on display at the Korean War exhibit.

Awards and honors
Pirate received four battle stars for Korean War service.

References

External links
 

Admirable-class minesweepers
World War II minesweepers of the United States
Korean War minesweepers of the United States
Ships built in Chickasaw, Alabama
Ships sunk by mines
Maritime incidents in 1950
Shipwrecks in the Sea of Japan
1943 ships